Mokon is a division of Protective Industries, Inc. from Buffalo, New York, United States.

It is also the brand name of the circulating liquid temperature control systems delivering fluid temperatures from  that are designed and manufactured by this division.

Created from the need for "mold control", the company's corporate engineers responsible for the manufacture of a line of proprietary plastic closures used worldwide (Caplugs), originally developed a temperature control system to meet their own exacting need for a compact, safe, and efficient means of maintaining close control over their fast-cycle injection molding machines. In 1955, the corporation opened a new division of the company, MOKON, to further design, manufacture, and market their line of high quality water temperature control systems.

A few years later, Mokon's engineering team developed a unique hot oil heat transfer system for higher temperature applications. As the two product lines expanded, so did the need for other products, and they next designed a line of portable chillers and full range systems (combination heating and cooling) in the mid-1980s. 2003, MOKON added central chillers and pump tanks and then blown film coolers in early 2008.

In addition to the release of new products, MOKON expanded the kilowatt and tonnage capacities, and temperature range of the process fluid from  resulting in one of the most comprehensive lines of temperature control systems for industrial and commercial applications.

Today the MOKON product line includes: water temperature control systems, heat transfer oil systems, portable and central chillers, pumping stations and tanks, inline heating and cooling skid packages, blown film coolers, engineered and pre-engineered control panels, positive and negative pressure systems, filtration maintenance products, and custom designed and engineered systems.

See also 
 Control panel

References

Companies based in Buffalo, New York